The Gran Premio Merano is an annual horse racing event which takes place in September in Pferderennplatz Meran, Meran/Merano, Italy. First run in 1935, it quickly became Italy's most prestigious and valuable steeplechase and the attendance is roughly 13,000 People. The race, 5,000 meters long, includes twenty-four obstacles and is run over a twisting, figure-of-eight course. The purse in 2018 was € 250.000.

Winners since 2000

Records 
 1st winner: Roi de Trèfle
 Most victories for a horse: 3 (Or Jack)
 Most victories for a jockey: 4 (Christophe Pieux)

References 
 Galopp-Sieger.de – Gran Premio Merano

External links 
Official website

Horse races in Italy
Merano
Sport in South Tyrol
Steeplechase (horse racing)